Rich Hill, near Bel Alton, Maryland, was owned by Colonel Samuel Cox, a Confederate sympathizer during the American Civil War. Following the assassination of President Abraham Lincoln on April 14, 1865, Cox hid assassin John Wilkes Booth and his companion, David Herold, in a swamp near Rich Hill.  Booth and Herold left the property on April 21, crossing the Potomac River in a small boat.

Following Booth's capture, Cox was tried and convicted of aiding Booth, receiving a light sentence.

The house is significant in its own right, showing characteristic features of southern Maryland house construction.

It was listed on the National Register of Historic Places in 1975.

References

External links
, including photo in 1975, at Maryland Historical Trust

Houses in Charles County, Maryland
Houses on the National Register of Historic Places in Maryland
Houses completed in 1825
Assassination of Abraham Lincoln
Maryland in the American Civil War
National Register of Historic Places in Charles County, Maryland